The Ballarat Football League (BFL) is an Australian rules football competition that operates in the Ballarat region of Victoria, Australia.

The competition formed in 1893 as the Ballarat Football Association and was renamed Ballarat Football League in 1908 and was briefly known as the Ballarat-Wimmera Football League between 1934 and 1936.

Overview 

The league features 11 senior clubs. North Ballarat City Football Club joined the league in 2008 season raising the number of teams to the present number. North Ballarat City previously played in the Bendigo Football League for the previous two seasons prior to joining. The BFL is also a strong league for grass roots football with 9 junior clubs consisting of 63 teams from U/10 through to U/16.5 (Ballarat, Bacchus Marsh, Darley, East Ballarat, Lake Wendouree, Mount Clear, North Ballarat, Redan and Sebastopol ).

The Ballarat Football League season normally commences in early April with the regular season matches finishing in August. Upon Daylesford's withdrawal from the competition at the end of the 2005 season competing clubs played the opposition clubs twice in the regular season, once at home, once away. This reverted upon North City's admission to the competition in 2008. The finals series is conducted in September with the Grand Final to decide the premiers for season having been historically held at the Ballarat City and Eastern Ovals. The match attracts crowds of 5000 to 9000 people, with notable attendances of 14602 at the Ballarat City Oval and 8,800 at the Eastern Oval for the 1949 and 1977 Grand Finals respectively.

In 2017, the BFL announced that from 2017 the Grand Final would be played at Mars Stadium with other finals series games remaining at the Eastern and City Ovals.

Being the major Australian Rules competition in the region, the BFL receives substantial media coverage with match reports in Ballarat daily newspaper The Courier as well as match radio coverage on radio stations 979fm (BFL Game Of The Round) and Apple 98.5fm (BFL Game Day).

Current clubs

Notes

Governance 
The management of the BFNL is overseen by an independent board of directors. The current chairman is Adrian Bettio.

The daily operation are managed by the general manager, Shane Anwyl along with two staff members.

Former Clubs

 Army
 Ararat
 Ballarat Imperials
 Beaufort
 Daylesford
 East Ballarat 
 Geelong West
 Golden Point 
 Learmonth-Waubra 
 Maddingley
 Maryborough
 Military Hospital 
 RAAF
 Smeaton 
 Waubra 

Notes

Premiers 

1893 Ballarat Imperials
1894 Ballarat Imperials
1895 Ballarat Imperials
1896 Ballarat Imperials
1897 Ballarat
1898 Ballarat
1899 Ballarat Imperials
1900 Ballarat Imperials
1901 Ballarat Imperials
1902 Ballarat Imperials
1903 Ballarat Imperials
1904 South Ballarat
1905 Ballarat Imperials
1906 Ballarat Imperials
1907 South Ballarat
1908 Ballarat
1909 South Ballarat
1910 Golden Point
1911 South Ballarat
1912 South Ballarat
1913 South Ballarat
1914 Golden Point
1915–1918 League in recess 
1919 Golden Point
1920 Golden Point
1921 Golden Point
1922 Ballarat Imperials
1923 Ballarat
1924 Maryborough
1925 Maryborough
1926 South Ballarat
1927 Maryborough
1928 Ballarat
1929 Ballarat Imperials
1930 Ballarat
1931 Maryborough
1932 Ballarat
1933 Ballarat
1934 Ballarat Imperials
1935 Ballarat Imperials
1936 Ballarat Imperials
1937 Ballarat Imperials
1938 South Ballarat
1939 Golden Point
1940 Ballarat
1941 League in recess
1942 Ballarat
1943 Ballarat
1944 Ballarat
1945 Golden Point
1946 Redan
1947 Golden Point
1948 Golden Point
1949 East Ballarat
1950 East Ballarat
1951 Ballarat
1952 Redan
1953 Golden Point
1954 Ballarat
1955 Ballarat
1956 Geelong West
1957 Geelong West
1958 Geelong West
1959 Geelong West
1960 Maryborough
1961 Daylesford
1962 Ballarat
1963 North Ballarat
1964 East Ballarat
1965 Maryborough
1966 Golden Point
1967 Golden Point
1968 Maryborough
1969 Beaufort
1970 North Ballarat
1971 Ballarat
1972 Maryborough
1973 North Ballarat
1974 Maryborough
1975 Redan
1976 Redan
1977 Redan
1978 North Ballarat
1979 North Ballarat
1980 Golden Point
1981 Golden Point
1982 North Ballarat
1983 North Ballarat
1984 North Ballarat
1985 North Ballarat
1986 North Ballarat
1987 Golden Point
1988 Ballarat
1989 East Ballarat
1990 East Ballarat
1991 North Ballarat
1992 North Ballarat
1993 East Ballarat
1994 North Ballarat
1995 North Ballarat
1996 North Ballarat
1997 Sunbury
1998 Sunbury
1999 Sunbury
2000 Melton
2001 Melton
2002 Redan
2003 Redan
2004 Sunbury
2005 Melton
2006 Redan
2007 Redan
2008 Ballarat
2009 Redan
2010 Lake Wendouree
2011 Redan
2012 Sunbury
2013 North Ballarat City
2014 North Ballarat City
2015 Darley
2016 Bacchus Marsh
2017 Darley
2018 East Point
2019 East Point
2020 League in recess due to COVID19 pandemic
2022 Melton

Source

Henderson Medalists

Ladders

1997

1998

1999

2000

2001

2002

2003

2004

2005

2006

2007

2008

2009

2010

2011

2012

2013

2014

2015

2016

2017

References

Bibliography
 History of Football in the Ballarat District by John Stoward -

External links
Official Ballarat Football League website

 
Ballarat Football League clubs
Australian rules football competitions in Victoria (Australia)